Candy Robinson, Jr. (February 24, 1940 – February 15, 2011) was an American baseball coach and former pitcher. He played college baseball at Grambling State for head coach Ralph Waldo Emerson Jones from 1961 to 1964 before playing in Minor League Baseball (MiLB) from 2 years from 1967 to 1968. He then served as head coach of the Texas Southern Tigers (1990–2008). On February 15, 2011, Robinson died from cancer.

References

1940 births
2011 deaths
Grambling State Tigers baseball players
Greenwood Braves players
Rock Hill Indians players
Texas Southern Tigers baseball coaches
Deaths from cancer in Texas